Pak Ka Choon Village (Malay: Kampung Pak Ka Choon; ; literally: 100 houses village) is a small village located in Bahau, Negeri Sembilan state, Malaysia. 

Pak Ka Choon is connected to Bahau town via federal route Jalan Rompin. Even though it is literally named '100 houses village', the village actually consist of 93 shops and houses in total. Its residence mainly consists of Cantonese-speaking Chinese. The postcode is 72100.

Nearby Town/ Villages 

 Kampung Bakar Batu
 Taman Cempaka
 Taman Awana Indah
 Rompin
 Mahsan

Gallery 

Jempol District
Villages in Negeri Sembilan